Psidium dumetorum, the Jamaican guava or Jamaican psidium, was a species of plant in the family Myrtaceae endemic to Jamaica. It is now extinct.

References

dumetorum
Endemic flora of Jamaica
Trees of Jamaica
Extinct flora of North America
Plant extinctions since 1500
Taxonomy articles created by Polbot